Sicilian cuisine is the style of cooking on the island of Sicily. It shows traces of all cultures that have existed on the island of Sicily over the last two millennia. Although its cuisine has much in common with Italian cuisine, Sicilian food also has Greek, Spanish, French and Arab influences.

The Sicilian cook Mithaecus, born during 5th century BC, is credited with having brought knowledge of Sicilian gastronomy to Greece: his cookbook was the first in Greek, therefore he was the earliest cookbook author in any language whose name is known.

History
Much of the island was initially settled by Greek colonists,  who left a preference for fish, wheat, olives, grapes, broad beans, chickpeas, lentils, almonds, pistachios,   and fresh vegetables.
Arab influences on Sicilian cuisine trace to the Arab domination of Sicily in the 10th and early 11th centuries, and include the use of sugar, citrus, rice, raisins, pine nuts and spices such as saffron, nutmeg, and cinnamon. Norman influences are also found, such as in the fondness for meat dishes. The Jewish community, who lived in the island, also left their mark on the Sicilian cuisine, they were responsible for introducing garlic fried in olive oil into the sauce. Later, the Spanish introduced numerous items from the New World, including cocoa, maize, peppers, zucchini, potatoes, and tomatoes, along with other produce. Much of the island's cuisine encourages the use of fresh vegetables such as eggplant, artichoke, and tomatoes, and fish such as tuna, sea bream, sea bass, cuttlefish, and swordfish. In Trapani in the extreme western corner of the island, North African influences are clear in the use of couscous.

Dishes

Starters
The starters (called antipasti) are an important aspect of Sicilian cuisine. Common Sicilian starters include caponata and gatò di patate (a kind of potato and cheese pie).

Soups
Maccu is a Sicilian soup and foodstuff prepared with fava beans as a primary ingredient. It is a peasant food and staple  that dates back to ancient history. Maccu di San Giuseppe (English: maccu of St. Joseph) is a traditional Sicilian dish that consists of various ingredients and maccu. The dish may be prepared on Saint Joseph's Day in Sicily, to clear out pantries and allow room for the spring's new crops of vegetables.

Pasta
Sicily is the oldest Italian and Western location on record where pasta worked into long and thin form was part of the local cuisine. This dates back to around the 12th century, as attested by the Tabula Rogeriana of Muhammad al-Idrisi, reporting some traditions about the Sicilian kingdom.

Spaghetti ai ricci di mare (spaghetti prepared with sea urchin), pasta con le sarde (with sardines) and pasta alla Norma (a specialty that originated in Catania) are the most popular pasta dishes that are typically Sicilian. Cannelloni is another common dish. Another popular dish in eastern Sicily is pasta with capuliato.

Main dish
After the pasta, the typical Sicilian menu includes a second or main dish (secondi) based on meat or fish. Main dishes based on seafood are couscous al pesce and pesce spada alla ghiotta (swordfish).

Desserts and sweets

Sweets are another specialty. Examples include: frutta martorana, Pignolata of Messina, buccellato, cannoli, granita, cassata siciliana and the Crocetta of Caltanissetta, a sweet that disappeared and was rediscovered in 2014.

Candy in Sicily was heavily influenced by the Arab candymakers in the 9th century, and Sicilian candy has preserved more of that influence than almost any other place in Europe. Marzipan fruits may have been invented at the Convent of Eloise at Martorana in the 14th century. In the 17th and 18th centuries, many Sicilian monasteries produced candies and pastries, some with sexual or fertility themes. The only surviving convent to follow this tradition is the Monastery of the Virgins of Palermo, which makes breast-shaped cakes in honor of Saint Agatha of Sicily.

Traditional sugar statues, called pupa di cena, are still made, although now featuring modern celebrities or culture figures.

Granita is particularly famous and well known. It is a semi-frozen dessert of sugar, water, and flavourings originally from the island, and is commonly associated with Messina or Catania, even though there is no evident proof that it hails from any particular Sicilian city. Related to sorbet and Italian ice, in most of Sicily it has a coarser, more crystalline texture. Food writer Jeffrey Steingarten says that "the desired texture seems to vary from city to city" on the island; on the west coast and in Palermo, it is at its chunkiest, and in the east it is nearly as smooth as sorbet. This is largely the result of different freezing techniques: the smoother types are produced in a gelato machine, while the coarser varieties are frozen with only occasional agitation, then scraped or shaved to produce separated crystals.

Fruits

Citrus fruits are a popular ingredient in Sicilian cuisine. Many were first introduced by the Arabs from the 9th to 11th centuries, but some, such as the Washington navel from Brazil, have been brought to the island more recently. Examples of citrus fruits found in Sicily are :
 Biondo comune - the "common blonde" orange
 Ovale - ripens between April and May, with a compact flesh
 Sanguigno comune - common blood orange harvested between January and April
 Washington navel - introduced from Brazil during the 1940s-1950s, grown chiefly near Ribera and Sciacca and harvested from November to January
 Sanguinella - bitter orange of the blood orange variety, found in Paternò Santa Maria di Licodia, Palagonia, Scordia and Francofonte during January until April
 Tarocco - high quality blood orange found in Catania, Siracusa and Francofonte from November to January
 Tarocco dal muso - bell shaped orange found in Francofonte
 Valencia - similar to the Ovale and used often in confectionery items
 Moro - crimson colored flesh found in Lentini, Scordia, and Francofonte from mid-January until the end of April
 Comune - common variety of the mandarin orange
  - a second variety of the mandarin orange found in Sicily
 Femminello, Siracusa lemon - the lemon that makes up 80% of Sicily's lemon crop, found in Catania, Syracuse, Messina and Palermo
 Monachello - "little monk" lemon harvested from October from March and able to withstand drought better that the Femminello
 Verdello - a lime that grows particularly well and is harvested from May to September

Wines and drinks

The drink most often served with the main meal in Sicily is wine. The soil and climate in Sicily are ideal for growing grapes, mainly due to Mount Etna, and a wine-making tradition on the island has existed since the Greeks first set up colonies on the island. Today, all Sicilian provinces produce wine and Sicilian wine produced by modern methods has established itself on the European wine market.

Sicilian red wines have an alcoholic content of 12.5 to 13.5% and are usually drunk in the evening with roast or grilled meat. Well-known red wines include the Cerasuolo di Vittoria and the Nero d'Avola, mainly those produced around Noto (Siracusa). The dry and white wines and rosés usually have an alcoholic content from 11.5 to 12.5% and are mainly consumed with fish, poultry and pasta dishes. Sicily is also known for producing dessert wines, such as Marsala and the Malvasia delle Lipari.

Other common Sicilian alcoholic drinks include limoncello, a lemon liqueur, and Amaro Siciliano, a herbal drink, which is often consumed after meals as a digestive.

Street food

Sicilians eat large quantities of street food, including the renowned arancini (a form of deep-fried rice croquettes). Popular street foods include, pani ca meusa and pane e panelle in the Palermo region,  and cipolline in the Catania region, and and  messinese (or Pitone or Pidune, in dialect)  in the Messina region.

See also
 Biscotti Regina
 Italian cuisine
 List of Sicilian dishes
 Sicilian pizza

References